Nico Binst (born 20 May 1992) is a Belgian professional footballer who plays as a forward for Knokke in the Belgian National Division 1.

Career
In April 2020, it was announced that Binst had signed with Knokke, joining them in July 2020 after the expiration of his contract with Rupel Boom.

References

External links

1992 births
Living people
Belgian footballers
Royal Antwerp F.C. players
Lierse S.K. players
K. Rupel Boom F.C. players
Challenger Pro League players
Belgian Third Division players
Association football forwards
RWDM47 players
S.C. Eendracht Aalst players
Footballers from Flemish Brabant
People from Meise